The World Group Qualifying Round were the main play-offs of 2002 Davis Cup. Winners advanced to the World Group, and loser were relegated in the Zonal Regions I.

Teams
Bold indicates team has qualified for the 2003 Davis Cup World Group.

 From World Group

 From Americas Group I

 From Asia/Oceania Group I

 From Europe/Africa Group I

Results

Playoff results

Australia vs. India

Zimbabwe vs. Belgium

Brazil vs. Canada

Germany vs. Venezuela

Great Britain vs. Thailand

Finland vs. Netherlands

Slovakia vs. Romania

Morocco vs. Switzerland

References

World Group Qualifying Round